Aravaipa can refer to
Aravaipa Canyon Wilderness, a wilderness area located in the U.S. state of Arizona
Aravaipa Creek, a major drainage between three mountain ranges in southwest Graham County, Arizona
Aravaipa, Arizona, formerly Dunlap, a former populated place, on Arizona Gulch, in Arizona
The Aravaipa Apache people, whose home is the San Carlos Apache Indian Reservation in southeastern Arizona, United States